The Bavanište Monastery is a 15th-century Serb Orthodox monastery located in Bavanište, Kovin in northern Serbia (Banat, Vojvodina).

It was founded in the 15th century and eventually deserted when the Ottoman Empire advanced, subsequently conquering most Balkan states. It was destroyed in 1716. It was rebuilt in 1856–58. In 1997 the monastery was renovated and reinstituted as a working monastery. A healthy water spring exists in the monastery.

See also
List of Serb Orthodox monasteries

References

External links
Monasteries in Banat

Christian monasteries established in the 15th century
15th-century Serbian Orthodox church buildings
19th-century Serbian Orthodox church buildings
Serbian Orthodox monasteries in Vojvodina
Banat
1997 in Serbia